"Little Woman" is a 1969 song recorded by Bobby Sherman and composed by Danny Janssen.

Background
Session musicians on this recording included James Burton and Alton Hendrickson on guitar, Don Randi on piano, Jerry Scheff on bass, Richard Hyde on trombone, Joe Burnett and Ollie Mitchell on trumpet, Theodore Nash and Jim Horn on sax, William Kurasch, Leonard Malarsky, Paul Shure, Gloria Strassner, Assa Drori  and Samuel Cytron on violins, David Filerman on cello, Emil Richards on percussion, Jim Gordon on drums. Initial copies were released with Sherman singing Bob Dylan's song "One Too Many Mornings" as B-side. Some later copies substituted "Love", a song written by Sherman himself.

Chart performance
Sherman's first single release on Metromedia Records, it reached No. 3 on the Billboard Hot 100 and achieved gold certification. On the rival Cashbox chart, it reached No. 1 for one week. It also sold well in Canada, where it reached No. 2 in the RPM charts. In New Zealand, "Little Woman" reached No. 5. The song earned Sherman a gold record, his first of four in the U.S.

See also 

 Little Women (disambiguation)

References

1969 songs
1969 singles
Bobby Sherman songs
Cashbox number-one singles